The 1964 United States Senate election in New Jersey was held on November 3, 1964. Incumbent Democrat Harrison A. Williams defeated Republican nominee Bernard M. Shanley with 61.91% of the vote.

Primary elections
Primary elections were held on April 21, 1964.

Democratic primary

Candidates
Harrison A. Williams, incumbent United States Senator

Results

Republican primary

Candidates
Bernard M. Shanley, former White House Counsel

Results

General election

Candidates
Major party candidates
Harrison A. Williams, Democratic
Bernard M. Shanley, Republican

Other candidates
Harold P. Poeschel, Independent
Lawrence Stewart, Socialist Workers
John V. Mahalchik, Independent
Albert Ronis, Socialist Labor

Results

References

1964
New Jersey
United States Senate